Larry J. Seidman (March 23, 1950 – September 7, 2017) was an American neuropsychologist who served as a professor of psychology at Harvard Medical School starting in 2004, and as vice chair for research in the Massachusetts Mental Health Center Public Psychiatry Division at Beth Israel Deaconess Medical Center starting in 2005. His research focused on the neuropsychology of epilepsy and schizophrenia. On September 7, 2017, he died suddenly of a heart attack at the age of 67. Since 2018, the International Early Psychosis Association (IEPA) has awarded the annual Larry J. Seidman Award for Outstanding Mentorship in his honor.

References

External links

1950 births
2017 deaths
20th-century American psychologists
Neuropsychologists
American clinical psychologists
City College of New York alumni
Boston University alumni
Harvard Medical School faculty